The 2004 IIHF World Women's Championships were held March 30 – April 6, 2004 in Halifax and Dartmouth, Canada at the Halifax Metro Centre (now known as Scotiabank Centre), and the Dartmouth Sportsplex (now known as Zatzman Sportsplex). The Canadian national women's hockey team won their eighth straight World Championships. The event had 9 teams, because the 2003 event was cancelled due to the SARS epidemic, therefore no teams were relegated and the winners of the 2002 and 2003 Division I tournaments qualified. Canada won their 37th consecutive World Championship game before losing 3–1 in their third game. They later avenged their loss to the US by defeating them in the gold medal game 2–1. Sweden and Finland also met each other twice, with Finland winning the bronze medal game 3–2 improving on the earlier draw.

In addition to being the qualifications for the 2005 world tournaments, this year also finalized the qualification for the Torino Olympics.

Top Division

Preliminary round

Group A

Group B

Group C

Qualifying round

Group D

Group E

Group F

Final round

Bronze medal game

Final

Final standings

Awards and statistics

Scoring leaders
GP = Games played; G = Goals; A = Assists; Pts = Points; +/− = Plus-minus; PIM = Penalties In MinutesSource: IIHF.com

Goaltending leaders
(minimum 40% team's total ice time)

TOI = Time on ice (minutes:seconds); GA = Goals against; GAA = Goals against average; Sv% = Save percentage; SO = ShutoutsSource: IIHF.com

Directorate Awards
Goaltender:  Kim St. Pierre
Defenceman:  Angela Ruggiero
Forward:  Jayna Hefford
Most Valuable Player:  Jennifer Botterill

All-Star team
Goaltender:  Pam Dreyer
Defencemen:  Gunilla Andersson,  Angela Ruggiero
Forwards:  Jennifer Botterill,  Natalie Darwitz,  Jayna Hefford

Division I
The Division I IIHF World Women's Championships were held March 14–20, 2004 in Ventspils, Latvia

Awards and statistics

Directorate Awards
Goalie: Yelena Kuznetsova, (Kazakhstan)
Defender: Olga Konysheva, (Kazakhstan)
Forward: Iveta Koka, (Latvia)
Source: Passionhockey.com

Scoring leaders 
GP = Games played; G = Goals; A = Assists; Pts = Points; +/− = Plus-minus; PIM = Penalties In MinutesSource: IIHF.com

Goaltending leaders 
(minimum 40% team's total ice time)

TOI = Time on ice (minutes:seconds); GA = Goals against; GAA = Goals against average; Sv% = Save percentage; SO = ShutoutsSource: IIHF.com

Division II
The Division II IIHF World Women's Championships will be held March 14–20, 2004 in Sterzing, Italy

Awards and statistics

Directorate Awards
Goalie:  Zuzana Tomčíková
Defender:  Jana Kapustová
Forward:  Maria Leitner
Source: Passionhockey.com

Scoring leaders 
GP = Games played; G = Goals; A = Assists; Pts = Points; +/− = Plus-minus; PIM = Penalties In MinutesSource: IIHF.com

Goaltending leaders 
(minimum 40% team's total ice time)

TOI = Time on ice (minutes:seconds); GA = Goals against; GAA = Goals against average; Sv% = Save percentage; SO = ShutoutsSource: IIHF.com

Division III
The Division III IIHF Women World Championships were held March 21–28, 2004 in Maribor, Slovenia.

Awards and statistics

Directorate Awards
Goalie: Nina Geyer, (Austria)
Defender: Kerstin Oberhuber, (Austria)
Forward: Jasmina Rosar, (Slovenia)
Source: Passionhockey.com

Scoring leaders 
GP = Games played; G = Goals; A = Assists; Pts = Points; +/− = Plus-minus; PIM = Penalties In MinutesSource: [ IIHF.com]

Goaltending leaders

Citations

References
Complete results

IIHF results index for 2004

International ice hockey competitions hosted by Canada
World
IIHF Women's World Ice Hockey Championships
Ice hockey competitions in Halifax, Nova Scotia
2004 in Nova Scotia
March 2004 sports events in Canada
April 2004 sports events in Canada
Women's ice hockey competitions in Canada
21st century in Halifax, Nova Scotia
Sport in Dartmouth, Nova Scotia